Beavertown may refer to:

 Beavertown, Ohio, United States
 Beavertown, Blair County, Pennsylvania, United States
 Beavertown, Snyder County, Pennsylvania, United States
 Beavertown Brewery, a British brewery

See also

 Beaver (disambiguation)
 Beaverton (disambiguation)
 Beaverville (disambiguation)
 Beaver City (disambiguation)